Gölenkamp is a community in the district of Grafschaft Bentheim in Lower Saxony.

Geography

Location
Gölenkamp lies northwest of Nordhorn. It belongs to the Joint Community (Samtgemeinde) of Uelsen, whose administrative seat is in the town of the same name.

Constituent communities
The community’s three centres are Gölenkamp, Haftenkamp and Hardinghausen.

Politics

Mayor
Jan Benierman was elected honorary mayor in 2006.

Culture and sightseeing

Buildings
Spöllberg, a barrow from the Bronze Age, is located in Gölenkamp.

References

External links
Joint community’s webpage

County of Bentheim (district)